Corumbataia britskii is a species of armored catfish endemic to Brazil where it is found in small tributaries of the Sucuriú River, upper Paraná River Basin in the state of Mato Grosso do Sul.  This species was found in deforested areas in moderate to fast current streams. It associates with aquatic macrophytes or the submerged portion of marginal vegetation. In its gut contents were found filamentous blue-green algae, chlorophytes, diatoms and bark.  This species grows to a length of  SL.

The fish is named in honor of Heraldo A. Britski of the Universidade de São Paulo, for his many contributions to the understanding of Hypoptopomatinae catfishes of South America.

References
 

Otothyrinae
Fish of South America
Fish of Brazil
Endemic fauna of Brazil
Taxa named by Katianne Mara Ferreira
Taxa named by Alexandre Cunha Ribeiro
Fish described in 2007